In computer graphics, Slerp is shorthand for spherical linear interpolation, introduced by Ken Shoemake in the context of quaternion interpolation for the purpose of animating 3D rotation. It refers to constant-speed motion along a unit-radius great circle arc, given the ends and an interpolation parameter between 0 and 1.

Geometric Slerp
Slerp has a geometric formula independent of quaternions, and independent of the dimension of the space in which the arc is embedded. This formula, a symmetric weighted sum credited to Glenn Davis, is based on the fact that any point on the curve must be a linear combination of the ends. Let p0 and p1 be the first and last points of the arc, and let t be the parameter, 0 ≤ t ≤ 1. Compute Ω as the angle subtended by the arc, so that , the n-dimensional dot product of the unit vectors from the origin to the ends. The geometric formula is then

The symmetry lies in the fact that  . In the limit as Ω → 0, this formula reduces to the corresponding symmetric formula for linear interpolation,

A Slerp path is, in fact, the spherical geometry equivalent of a path along a line segment in the plane; a great circle is a spherical geodesic.

Letting , and applying the trigonometric identity , this becomes the Slerp formula.

Some special cases of Slerp admit more efficient calculation. When a circular arc is to be drawn into a raster image, the preferred method is some variation of Bresenham's circle algorithm. Another special case, common in animation, is evaluation with fixed ends and equal parametric steps. If pk−1 and pk are two consecutive values, and if c is twice their dot product (constant for all steps), then the next value, pk+1, is the reflection .

Quaternion Slerp
When Slerp is applied to unit quaternions, the quaternion path maps to a path through 3D rotations in a standard way. The effect is a rotation with uniform angular velocity around a fixed rotation axis. When the initial end point is the identity quaternion, Slerp gives a segment of a one-parameter subgroup of both the Lie group of 3D rotations, SO(3), and its universal covering group of unit quaternions, S3. Slerp gives a straightest and shortest path between its quaternion end points, and maps to a rotation through an angle of 2Ω. However, because the covering is double (q and −q map to the same rotation), the rotation path may turn either the "short way" (less than 180°) or the "long way" (more than 180°). Long paths can be prevented by negating one end if the dot product, is negative, thus ensuring that −90° ≤ Ω ≤ 90°.

Slerp also has expressions in terms of quaternion algebra, all using exponentiation.

Here are four equivalent quaternion expressions for Slerp.

 

The initial tangent vector is parallel transported to each tangent along the curve; thus the curve is, indeed, a geodesic.

In the tangent space at any point on a quaternion Slerp curve, the inverse of the exponential map transforms the curve into a line segment. Slerp curves not extending through a point fail to transform into lines in that point's tangent space.

Quaternion Slerps are commonly used to construct smooth animation curves by mimicking affine constructions like the de Casteljau algorithm for Bézier curves. Since the sphere is not an affine space, familiar properties of affine constructions may fail, though the constructed curves may otherwise be entirely satisfactory. For example, the de Casteljau algorithm may be used to split a curve in affine space; this does not work on a sphere.

The two-valued Slerp can be extended to interpolate among many unit quaternions, but the extension loses the fixed execution-time of the Slerp algorithm.

See also
Quaternions and spatial rotation
Spherical mean (statistics)

References

External links
 
 
 
 

Computer graphics algorithms
Quaternions
Interpolation
Rotation in three dimensions
Spherical curves